

Australia
 Christmas Island
Administrator – Francis Charles Boyle, Administrator of Christmas Island (1977–1980)
 Cocos (Keeling) Islands
Administrator – Charles Ivens Buffett, Administrator of Cocos (Keeling) Islands (1977–1981)
Council Chairman – Parson bin Yapat, Chairman of the Cocos Islands Council (1979–1981)
 Norfolk Island
 Administrator –
 Desmond Vincent O'Leary, Administrator of Norfolk Island (1976–1979)
 Peter Coleman, Administrator of Norfolk Island (1979–1981)
 Chief Minister – David Buffett, Chief Minister of Norfolk Island (1979–1986)

Denmark
 Faroe Islands
High Commissioner – Leif Groth, High Commissioner in the Faroe Islands (1972–1981)
 Prime Minister – Atli Dam, Prime Minister of the Faroe Islands (1970–1981)
 Greenland
Governor – Hans Lassen, Governor of Greenland (1973–1979)
High Commissioner – Torben Hede Pedersen, High Commissioner in Greenland (1979–1992)
 Prime Minister – Jonathan Motzfeldt, Prime Minister of Greenland (1979–1991)

France
 French Polynesia
 High Commissioner – Paul Cousseran, High Commissioner of the Republic in French Polynesia (1977–1981)
 Mayotte
 Prefect – Jean Rigotard, Prefect of Mayotte (1978–1980)
 President of the General Council – Younoussa Bamana, President of the General Council of Mayotte (1976–1991)
 New Caledonia
 High Commissioner – Claude Charbonniaud, Governor of New Caledonia (1978–1981)
 New Hebrides – condominium together with the United Kingdom
British Resident Commissioner – Andrew Stuart (1978–1980)
French Resident Commissioner – Jean-Jacques Robert (1978–1980)
Chief Minister –
 Gérard Leymang, Chief Minister of New Hebrides (1978–1979)
 Walter Lini, Chief Minister of New Hebrides (1979–1991)
 Saint Pierre and Miquelon
 Prefect –
 Pierre Eydoux, Prefect of Saint Pierre and Miquelon (1977–1979)
 Clément Bouhin, Prefect of Saint Pierre and Miquelon (1979–1981)
 President of the General Council – Albert Pen, President of the General Council of Saint Pierre and Miquelon (1968–1984)
 Wallis and Futuna
 Administrator-Superior –
 Henri Beaux, Administrator Superior of Wallis and Futuna (1976–1979)
 Pierre Isaac, Administrator Superior of Wallis and Futuna (1979–1980)
 President of the Territorial Assembly – Manuele Lisiahi, President of the Territorial Assembly of Wallis and Futuna (1978–1984)

New Zealand
 Cook Islands
 Queen's Representative – Sir Gaven Donne, Queen's Representative of the Cook Islands (1975–1984)
 Prime Minister – Tom Davis, Prime Minister of the Cook Islands (1978–1983)
 Niue
 Premier – Robert Rex, Premier of Niue (1974–1992)
 Tokelau
 Administrator – Frank Corner, Administrator of Tokelau (1975–1984)

Portugal
 Macau
 Governor –
 José Garcia Leandro, Governor of Macau (1974–1979)
 Melo Egídio, Governor of Macau (1979–1981)

South Africa
 South West Africa
Administrator-General –
 Marthinus T. Steyn, Administrator-General of South West Africa (1977–1979)
 Gerrit Viljoen, Administrator-General of South West Africa (1979–1980)

United Kingdom
 Antigua
Governor – Sir Wilfred Jacobs, Governor of Antigua (1967–1993)
Premier – Vere Bird, Premier of Antigua (1976–1994)
 Belize
Governor – Peter Donovan McEntee, Governor of Belize (1976–1980)
Premier – George Cadle Price, Premier of Belize (1961–1984)
 Bermuda
 Governor – Sir Peter Ramsbotham, Governor of Bermuda (1977–1980)
 Premier – David Gibbons, Premier of Bermuda (1977–1982)
 British Virgin Islands
 Governor – James Alfred Davidson, Governor of the British Virgin Islands (1978–1982)
 Chief Minister –
 Willard Wheatley, Chief Minister of the British Virgin Islands (1971–1979)
 Lavity Stoutt, Chief Minister of the British Virgin Islands (1979–1983)
 Brunei
High Commissioner – Arthur Christopher Watson, British High Commissioner in Brunei (1978–1984)
Sultan – Hassanal Bolkiah, Sultan of Brunei (1967–present)
Chief Minister – Pengiran Dipa Negara Laila Diraja Pengiran Abdul Mumin, Chief Minister of Brunei (1972–1981)
 Cayman Islands
 Governor – Thomas Russell, Governor of the Cayman Islands (1974–1982)
 Falkland Islands
 Governor – Sir James Roland Walter Parker, Governor of the Falkland Islands (1977–1980)
 Gibraltar
 Governor – Sir William Jackson, Governor of Gibraltar (1978–1982)
 Chief Minister – Sir Joshua Hassan, Chief Minister of Gibraltar (1972–1987)
Gilbert Islands
gained independence as Kiribati on 12 July 1979
Governor – Reginald James Wallace, Governor of Gilbert Islands (1978–1979)
Chief Minister – Ieremia Tabai, Chief Minister of Gilbert Islands (1978–1979)
 Guernsey
 Lieutenant-Governor – Sir John Edward Ludgate Martin, Lieutenant-Governor of Guernsey (1974–1980)
 Bailiff – Sir John Loveridge, Bailiff of Guernsey (1973–1982)
 Hong Kong
 Governor – Sir Murray MacLehose, Governor of Hong Kong (1971–1982)
 Isle of Man
 Lieutenant-Governor – Sir John Warburton Paul, Lieutenant-Governor of Man (1974–1980)
 Head of Government – Clifford Irving, Chairman of the Executive Council of the Isle of Man (1977–1981)
 Jersey
 Lieutenant-Governor –
 Sir Desmond Fitzpatrick, Lieutenant-Governor of Jersey (1974–1979)
 Sir Peter Whiteley, Lieutenant-Governor of Jersey (1979–1985)
 Bailiff – Sir Frank Ereaut, Bailiff of Jersey (1975–1985)
 Montserrat
 Governor – Gwilyum Wyn Jones, Governor of Montserrat (1977–1980)
 Chief Minister – John Osborne, Chief Minister of Montserrat (1978–1991)
 New Hebrides – condominium together with France
British Resident Commissioner – Andrew Stuart (1978–1980)
French Resident Commissioner – Jean-Jacques Robert (1978–1980)
Chief Minister –
 Gérard Leymang, Chief Minister of New Hebrides (1978–1979)
 Walter Lini, Chief Minister of New Hebrides (1979–1991)
 Pitcairn Islands
 Governor – Sir Harold Smedley, Governor of the Pitcairn Islands (1976–1980)
 Magistrate – Ivan Christian, Magistrate of the Pitcairn Islands (1975–1984)
 Saint Christopher-Nevis-Anguilla
 Governor – Sir Probyn Ellsworth-Innis, Governor of Saint Christopher-Nevis-Anguilla (1975–1981)
 Premier –
 Paul Southwell, Premier of Saint Christopher-Nevis-Anguilla (1978–1979)
 Lee Moore, Premier of Saint Christopher-Nevis-Anguilla (1979–1980)
 Saint Helena and Dependencies
 Governor – Geoffrey Colin Guy, Governor of Saint Helena (1976–1981)
 Saint Lucia
gained independence on 22 February 1979
 Governor – Sir Allen Montgomery Lewis, Governor of Saint Lucia (1974–1979)
 Premier – John Compton, Prime Minister of Saint Lucia (1964–1979)
 Saint Vincent and the Grenadines
gained independence on 27 October 1979
 Governor – Sir Sydney Gun-Munro, Governor of Saint Vincent and the Grenadines (1976–1979)
 Premier – Milton Cato, Prime Minister of Saint Vincent and the Grenadines (1974–1984)
 Southern Rhodesia
Rhodesia returned to colonial status on December 12, 1979
Governor – Christopher Soames, Baron Soames, Governor of Southern Rhodesia (1979–1980)
 Turks and Caicos Islands
 Governor – John Clifford Strong, Governor of the Turks and Caicos Islands (1978–1982)
 Chief Minister – James Alexander George Smith McCartney, Chief Minister of Turks and Caicos Islands (1976–1980)

United States
 American Samoa
Governor – Peter Tali Coleman, Governor of American Samoa (1978–1985)
 Guam
 Governor –
 Ricardo Bordallo, Governor of Guam (1975–1979)
 Paul McDonald Calvo, Governor of Guam (1979–1983)
 Puerto Rico
 Governor – Carlos Romero Barceló, Governor of Puerto Rico (1977–1985)
 Trust Territory of the Pacific Islands
 High Commissioner – Adrian P. Winkel, High Commissioner of the Trust Territory of the Pacific Islands (1977–1981)
 Northern Mariana Islands (autonomous territory)
 Governor – Carlos S. Camacho, Governor of the Northern Mariana Islands (1978–1982)
Marshall Islands (autonomous territory)
President – Amata Kabua, President of the Marshall Islands (1979–1996)
Federated States of Micronesia (autonomous territory)
President – Tosiwo Nakayama, President of the Federated States of Micronesia (1979–1987)
 United States Virgin Islands
 Governor – Juan Francisco Luis, Governor of US Virgin Islands (1978–1987)

Colonial governors
Colonial governors
1979